Leccinum albostipitatum is a species of bolete fungus in the family Boletaceae. This fungus is commonly found in Europe, where it grows in association with poplar. It was described as new to science in 2005.

References

Fungi described in 2005
Fungi of Europe
albostipitatum
Taxa named by Machiel Noordeloos